Tetas de Maria Guevara are twin hills located near Laguna de la Restinga in central Isla Margarita, Venezuela.

Background
These hills are used as a landmark by local fishermen. They were declared a Natural Monument in 1974. The western hill, the higher, is only 75 metres (246') high, but they stand out in the surrounding flat arid plain and are easily seen from the ferry. One of the local legends say that these breast-shaped hills were named and given to a mestiza woman from Cumaná called Maria Guevara who fought in the Venezuelan War of Independence and breast fed soldiers. She had two sons of whom she breast fed as adults which is thought to be the reason of why they were such great warriors, hence the hills were named after her breasts. The estate was lost after her death and the Guevara family were never able to claim it their own, as the deeds of the island, documenting Marias possession of it were hidden in a papaya fruit. However, her tomb lies beneath the hills of the mountains.

See also
Isla Margarita
Breast-shaped hill

References

External links
 Just Venezuela - Las Tetas de Maria Guevara
Parque Nacional Laguna de La Restinga
Tetas De Maria Guevara

Margarita Island
Mountains of Venezuela
Natural monuments of Venezuela
Geography of Nueva Esparta
Tourist attractions in Nueva Esparta